Vyšehrad: Fylm is a 2022 Czech comedy film. It serves as a sequel to Vyšehrad tv series.

Cast
 Jakub Štáfek as Julius „Lavi“ Lavický
 Jakub Prachař as Jaroslav "Jarda" Mizina
 Ondřej Pavelka as Král
 Jiří Ployhar ml. as 
 Šárka Vaculíková as Lucie Mizinová
 Věra Hlaváčková as Mrs. Lavická
 Veronika Khek Kubařová as Mother of Lavi's son
 David Prachař as Miloš Mizina

References

External links
 

2022 films
2022 comedy films
Czech comedy films

2020s Czech-language films
Czech sequel films